John Kehoe may refer to:

 John Joseph Kehoe (1891–1967), politician in Ontario, Canada
 John Kehoe (Quebec politician) (born 1934), politician in Quebec, Canada
 John Kehoe (died 1949), New Zealand police officer killed in the line of duty
 John Ortiz-Kehoe, convicted in 1997 for a murder that was documented on the television show Forensic Files
 John "Black Jack" Kehoe, one of the Molly Maguires who was convicted of murder in 1877, pardoned in 1979

See also
Jack Kehoe (born 1938), American actor